The 2016 Coral Northern Ireland Open was a professional ranking snooker tournament that took place between 14 and 20 November 2016 at the Titanic Exhibition Centre in Belfast, Northern Ireland. It was the ninth ranking event of the 2016/2017 season.

This was the inaugural Northern Ireland Open event, being held as part of a new Home Nations Series introduced in the 2016/2017 season with the existing Welsh Open and new English Open and Scottish Open tournaments. The winner of the Northern Ireland Open is awarded the Alex Higgins Trophy which is named in honour of Northern Irish two-time world champion Alex Higgins.

Mark King won the first ranking title of his career by defeating Barry Hawkins 9–8 in the final.

John Higgins made the 123rd official maximum break in the fifth frame of his last 64 match against Sam Craigie. It was Higgins' eighth professional maximum.

Prize fund
The breakdown of prize money for this year is shown below:

 Winner: £70,000
 Runner-up: £30,000
 Semi-final: £20,000
 Quarter-final: £10,000
 Last 16: £6,000
 Last 32: £3,500
 Last 64: £2,500 

 Highest break: £2,000
 Total: £366,000
 
The "rolling 147 prize" for a maximum break stood at £10,000.

Main draw

Top half

Section 1

Section 2

Section 3

Section 4

Bottom half

Section 5

Section 6

Section 7

Section 8

Finals

Final

Century breaks

 147, 137, 130, 107  John Higgins
 142  Fergal O'Brien
 141, 133, 131, 126, 117, 108  Ronnie O'Sullivan
 139  Mark Williams
 138, 134, 124  Anthony Hamilton
 137, 130, 117, 104  Michael White
 133  Dominic Dale
 131  Chen Zhe
 130, 121  Yan Bingtao
 126, 117, 113  Barry Hawkins
 126  Kurt Dunham
 125, 108  Rhys Clark
 125  Alfie Burden
 125  James Cahill
 121  David Gilbert
 120  Peter Ebdon
 119, 112, 101  Kurt Maflin
 119  Hossein Vafaei
 118  Marco Fu
 118  Alan McManus

 117  Luca Brecel
 116, 109  Ricky Walden
 113, 109, 100  Kyren Wilson
 112  Michael Georgiou
 110, 100  Mark King
 110  Anthony McGill
 110  Tom Ford
 109  Mark Allen
 106  Scott Donaldson
 106  Sam Baird
 104  Sam Craigie
 104  Yu Delu
 103  Jamie Curtis-Barrett
 102  Jordan Brown
 102  Ken Doherty
 102  Liang Wenbo
 101  Robbie Williams
 102  Stephen Maguire
 100  Jack Lisowski
 100  Eden Sharav

References

Home Nations Series
2016
2016 in snooker
2016 in Northern Ireland sport
Sports competitions in Belfast
November 2016 sports events in the United Kingdom
2010s in Northern Ireland
21st century in Belfast